This is a list of all participating team squads at the 2014 FIVB Volleyball World League, played by twenty-eight countries.

Argentina  
Coach:   Julio Velascoassistant: Julián Alvares

Australia 
Coach:  Jon Uriarteassistant: Daniel Ilott

Belgium
Coach:  Dominique Baeyensassistant: Kris Tanghe

Brazil 
Coach:   Bernardo Rezendeassistant: Roberley Leonaldo

Bulgaria 
Coach:   Camillo Placiassistant: Dario Simoni

Canada 
Coach:    Glenn Hoagassistant: Vincent Pichette

China 
Coach:  Zhou Jian’anassistant: Liqun Yang

Cuba 
Coach:   Rodolfo Luis Sanchez Sanchezassistant: Victor Andres Garcia Campos

Czech Republic 
Coach:  Zdeněk Šmejkalassistant: Jindřich Licek

Finland 
Coach:  Tuomas Sammelvuoassistant: Nicola Giolito

France 
Coach:   Laurent Tillieassistant: Arnaud Josserand

Germany 
Coach:    Vital Heynenassistant: Stefan Hübner

Iran 
Coach:  Slobodan Kovaćassistant: Hossein Madani Gh.

Italy 
Coach:  Mauro Berrutoassistant: Andrea Brogioni

Japan 
Coach:   Masashi Nambuassistant: Koichiro Shimbo

Korea 
Coach:   Park Ki-wonassistant: Kim Kyounghoon

Mexico 
Coach:  Sergio Hernandezassistant: Ivan Contreras

Netherlands 
Coach:   Edwin Benne assistant: Arnold van Ree

Poland  
Coach:    Stephane Antigaassistant: Philippe Blain

Portugal 
Coach:   Hugo Silvaassistant: Carlos Plata

Puerto Rico 
Coach:  David Alemanassistant: Esai Velez

Russia 
Coach:  Andriej Woronkowassistant: Sergio Busato

Serbia 
Coach:  Igor Kolakovićassistant: Strahinja Kozić

Slovakia 
Coach:  Flavio Gulinelliassistant: Marek Kardoš

Spain 
Coach:   Fernando Muñozassistant: Carlos Carreño

Tunisia 
Coach:  Fethi Mkaouarassistant: Riadh Hedhili

Turkey
Coach:  Emanuele Zaniniassistant: Alper Hamurcu

United States
Coach:  John Sperawassistant: Matt Fuerbringer

References

2014
2014 in volleyball